The Pioneer Woman is a US cooking show that airs on Food Network. It is presented by Ree Drummond. The series features Drummond cooking for her family and friends, primarily at her ranch in Pawhuska, Oklahoma. The title of the series is taken from Drummond's blog of the same name.

Episodes

References

External links

2010s American cooking television series
2011 American television series debuts
English-language television shows
Food Network original programming
Food reality television series
Oklahoma Drummond family
Television shows filmed in Oklahoma